Brent M. Rathgeber (born July 24, 1964) is a lawyer, author and politician from Alberta, Canada. He was a Progressive Conservative member of the Legislative Assembly of Alberta from 2001 to 2004 and was elected to the House of Commons of Canada in the 2008 federal election as a Conservative. He resigned from the Conservative caucus in 2013 and sat as an Independent. He ran as an Independent candidate in the riding of St. Albert—Edmonton in the 2015 federal election, but was defeated by Conservative candidate Michael Cooper.

In 2016, Brent returned to the business world as a political consultant. Rathgeber joined Cody Law Office in St. Albert, providing a full range of legal services, advocacy and consulting. Rathgeber also writes a weekly political column for iPolitics.

Early life
Rathgeber was born in Melville, Saskatchewan. After graduating from Melville Comprehensive School in 1982, Brent obtained his Bachelor of Arts in Public Administration and Bachelor of Laws degrees from the University of Saskatchewan.

Career

Alberta MLA (2001–2004)
Rathgeber won election to the provincial electoral district of Edmonton Calder in the 2001 Alberta general election after defeating Liberal incumbent Lance White.

In the 2004 Alberta general election, after only serving one term in office, he was defeated by David Eggen of the New Democratic Party.

House of Commons (2008–2015)
Rathgeber stood as the Conservative Party of Canada candidate for the federal electoral district of Edmonton—St. Albert in the 2008 election, and was elected with 61.6 per cent of the vote. He was re-elected in the 2011 federal election.

Regarding supply management, Rathgeber said "One can occasionally be critical of the Government without being disloyal.  I proudly serve in the Conservative (Government) Caucus but do not leave the viewpoints of my constituents behind every time I board a plane to Ottawa.  It is natural for me to question Supply Management, since I represent 140,000 consumers but not a single dairy farmer.  Similarly, all of my adult constituents are taxpayers but only a tiny fraction work for the federal government; as a result, I believe it is appropriate that I question public pensions (including my own) and demand respect for taxpayer dollars generally."

Rathgeber has voiced his support for motion 312, which says Canada should re-examine when human life begins.

Rathgeber blogged in 2012 that voters complained to him about the limousine expenses of Tory cabinet ministers when he travelled to Saskatchewan for a funeral.

On 5 June 2013, Rathgeber announced that he had resigned from the Conservative Caucus due to what he believed to be the "Government's lack of commitment to transparency and open government."

In November 2014, Brent was awarded the honour of "Member of Parliament who best represents his constituents" by Maclean's magazine.  This award is voted on by all Members of Parliament and recognizes his ability to represent constituents more effectively when freed from party positions and discipline.

In the 2015 federal election, he ran as an independent in St. Albert—Edmonton, a reconfigured version of his old riding.  He finished third, with 19.7 percent of the vote, behind Conservative candidate, Michael Cooper.

Post-parliamentary career
Rathgeber currently writes a column for iPolitics.

Bibliography
 Irresponsible Government: The Decline of Parliamentary Democracy in Canada (September 2014) Dundurn Press

The book contrasts the current state of Canadian democracy to the founding principles of responsible government established by the Fathers of Confederation in 1867.  It examines the consequences of the inability or disincentive of modern elected representatives to perform their constitutionally mandated duty to hold the Prime Minister and his cabinet to account and the resultant disregard with which the executive now views Parliament.  A chapter is devoted to Withholding the power: Canada's broken Access to Information laws.

Electoral record

Provincial elections

References

External links
Official Website

iPolitics.ca Website

1964 births
Living people
Conservative Party of Canada MPs
Members of the House of Commons of Canada from Alberta
Progressive Conservative Association of Alberta MLAs
Independent MPs in the Canadian House of Commons
People from Melville, Saskatchewan
Politicians from Edmonton
University of Saskatchewan alumni
Canadian political writers
Writers from Edmonton
Writers from Saskatchewan
21st-century Canadian non-fiction writers
Independent candidates in the 2015 Canadian federal election
University of Saskatchewan College of Law alumni